Ribston Hall is a privately owned 17th-century country mansion situated on the banks of the River Nidd, at Great Ribston, near Knaresborough, North Yorkshire, England. It is a Grade II* listed building.

The two-storey mansion presents an impressive fifteen-bay entrance front to the north east. The adjoining chapel is said to contain traces of 13th-century masonry.

History

The estate at Ribston was granted by Robert de Ros to the Knights Templar in 1217 and passed to the Knights Hospitaller on the demise of the templars in the early 14th century. Following the Dissolution of the Monasteries the property reverted to the Crown and was granted to the Charles Brandon, 1st Duke of Suffolk, who sold it to Henry Goodricke in 1542.

Henry Goodricke was succeeded by his son Richard, who became High Sheriff of Yorkshire for 1579–80, and died in 1581. Richard was succeeded by his own son, Richard, who was High Sheriff of Yorkshire for 1591–92 and died in 1601. He was succeeded in turn by Sir Henry Goodricke whose son John was made Baronet Goodricke in 1641. As a Royalist Sir John suffered in the Civil War, being fined and then imprisoned in the Tower of London, from where he escaped to France. After the Restoration he was elected MP for Yorkshire in 1661, sitting until 1670.

In 1674 Sir Henry Goodricke, 2nd Baronet, the son of Sir John, was MP for Boroughbridge from 1673 to 1679 and from 1683 to his death in 1705. He built the existing house on the remains of the old property. The new Hall was the home of the Goodricke family until the death of the seventh Baronet in 1833, who was unmarried. He bequeathed the estate to Francis Littleton Holyoake of Studley Castle on condition that the latter adopted the Goodricke name. In 1836 Francis Holyoake-Goodricke sold the estate to Joseph Dent, of a well-to-do Lincolnshire family, who laid out the pinetum in the estate . He was High Sheriff for 1847.

The mansion remains the Dent family home. The estate is believed to have given its name to the Ribston Pippin apple.

References

External links

Grade II* listed buildings in North Yorkshire
Country houses in North Yorkshire
Grade II listed parks and gardens in North Yorkshire